The Kia Credos was Kia's first self developed mid-size family sedan, which went on sale in South Korea in 1995, and in Australia in 1998. The Credos is based on the fifth generation Mazda Capella/Cronos, which was sold stateside as the Mazda 626.

It was powered by one of four gasoline engines. Initially, three engines are offered, depending on the trim: 1.8-litre Kia T8D engine; 2.0-litre Mazda FE SOHC engine; and 2.0-litre Mazda FE-DOHC engine. A fourth engine, a licensed version of 2.0-litre V6 DOHC Rover KV6 engine, was available with the facelifted version from 1998 and on, which also added a station wagon variation, called the Parktown in its native Korea, where it was a commercial flop.

The car's interior was described as dull, but spacious and comfortable, as well as the boot being massive. The asking price for the basic 1.8 SX was £11,000, around £4,000 less than the equivalent Ford Mondeo and Vauxhall Vectra. In Australia, the Credos was introduced in May 1998, and was available only with the 2.0L engine. Sales totaled 839 units during the model's three-year run.

The Kia Credos was replaced by the Hyundai sourced Optima in September 2000, ending the badge engineered relationship with Mazda.

References 

Credos